jsoup is an open-source Java library designed to parse, extract, and manipulate data stored in HTML documents.

History

jsoup was created in 2009 by Jonathan Hedley. It is distributed it under the MIT License, a permissive free software license similar to the Creative Commons attribution license.

Hedley's avowed intention in writing jsoup was "to deal with all varieties of HTML found in the wild; from pristine and validating, to invalid tag-soup."

Projects powered by jsoup 

jsoup is used in a number of current projects, including Google's OpenRefine data-wrangling tool.

See also

 Comparison of HTML parsers
 Web scraping
 Data wrangling
 MIT License

References

External links
 

Java (programming language) libraries
Free software programmed in Java (programming language)
XML parsers
HTML parsers
Web scraping